Al Unser Jr. Arcade Racing is a racing computer video game for the Windows and Mac OS operating systems, released in 1995 by French publisher Mindscape and developed by its subsidiary, Mindscape Bordeaux.

Gameplay
The game allows a selection of 10 open wheel cars and 15 tracks. There are three racing options that the player can choose; circuit (with the tracks going in numerical order being chosen automatically by the computer), time limit trial (where the player has to race in a time limit, but go through checkpoints in order to get extended time. However, unlike the circuit race, the player can choose their own track), and a simple practice course where the player and their car race solo.

Reception

Al Unser Jr. Arcade Racing was a commercial hit, with sales of 1 million units by May 1998.

Computer Gaming World gave the game 3 out of 5 stars. They praised its graphics and gameplay but thought there was not enough depth to keep players interested in the game.

See also
 Al Unser Jr.

References

1995 video games
Racing video games
Classic Mac OS games
Video games developed in France
Video games scored by Frédéric Motte
Windows games
Mindscape games